Ulsan Hyundai FC is a South Korean professional football club based in Ulsan that competes in the K League 1, the top tier of South Korean football. Founded in 1983 as Hyundai Horang-i, they joined the K League in 1984. Their home ground is Ulsan Munsu Football Stadium. The club is owned by Hyundai Heavy Industries.

Ulsan Hyundai have won the national league three times, most recently in 2022, and the Korean FA Cup once, in 2017. At International level, they have won the AFC Champions League twice, in 2012 and 2020.

History

Early years: before Ulsan (1983–1989)
Ulsan Hyundai was established on 6 December 1983 as Hyundai Horang-i, with tiger as its mascot (horangi means tiger in Korean). Their original franchise area was Incheon and Gyeonggi Province. They joined the professional K League from 1984 season. While they finished their debut season as 3rd place, the team's striker Baek Jong-chul became the K League Top Scorer, scoring 16 goals in 28 matches. They won their first professional trophy in 1986, winning the Professional Football Championship, which is the origin of Korean League Cup. From the 1987 season, the club moved their franchise from Incheon and Gyeonggi Province to Gangwon Province. In the 1988 season, they finished the season as the runners-up in the league.

Move to Ulsan and rise to power (1990–1999)
Beginning in the 1990 season, the club moved their franchise to Ulsan, where the headquarters of several branches of owner company Hyundai are located at, from Gangwon Province. Former South Korea's striker Cha Bum-kun took the managerial position from the 1991 season, leading the club to the runners-up position in the league in his debut season. However, he failed to win any trophy and was replaced by Ko Jae-wook after the 1994 season. Under Ko Jae-wook, Ulsan won their second Korean League Cup trophy in 1995, which was his debut season as Ulsan manager. Ulsan won their first ever league title in 1996, beating Suwon Samsung Bluewings 3–2 on aggregate in the championship playoffs. The club then entered a long dry-spell in terms of league trophies, although they won their third Korean League Cup trophy in 1998, beating Bucheon SK 2–1 on aggregate in the finals.

Two Kims era (2000–2013)

Failure to add a major title for years did affect the team negatively. After the exodus of key players like Kim Hyun-seok and a terrible start in the 2000, manager Ko Jae-wook resigned in the middle of the season.

Kim Jung-nam era: Gangsters of Asia (2000–2008)
Ulsan appointed Kim Jung-nam, who had formerly managed South Korean national football team, as their next manager. They finished as runners-up in 2002 and 2003, and started to emerge as a strong force. In 2005, with the return of two key players, Yoo Sang-chul and Lee Chun-soo, they qualified for the championship playoffs. In the play-off semi-final, they beat Seongnam Ilhwa 2–1, and in the final, they beat Incheon United 6–3 on aggregate, with a hat-trick from Lee Chun-Soo in the first leg. They became the league champions for the second time in their history.

The club also went on to win the A3 Champions Cup in 2006, in which they participated as K League champions. Although they lost their first match in the competition against JEF United Ichihara Chiba 3–2, they beat Dalian Shide 4–0 and Gamba Osaka 6–0 to clinch the trophy. Lee Chun-soo became the competition's top scorer, scoring six goals in three matches. They repeated the merciless attacks in the AFC Champions League that season, beating Al-Shabab 6–0 in the first leg of the quarter-finals. These overwhelming attacks they showed in the season gave Ulsan the nickname "Gangsters of Asia".

Ulsan won the 2007 Korean League Cup, beating FC Seoul 2–1 in the final on 27 June 2007. In 2008, the team changed their official name from Ulsan Hyundai Horang-i to Ulsan Hyundai FC.

Kim Ho-kon era: Iron Mace Football (2009–2013)
Manager Kim Jung-nam stepped down after the 2008 season. Kim Ho-kon, who had managed the South Korea national under-23 football team that reached the quarter-finals in the 2004 Summer Olympics was appointed as Ulsan's next manager.

Kim Ho-kon did not enjoy Ulsan fans' full support for his first few seasons at the club, mainly because of his defensive tactical style and unsatisfying outcomes. The 2011 season was a dramatic changeover; Ulsan won their fifth Korean League Cup, beating Busan IPark 3–2 in the final. Ulsan also finished the season as runners-up in the K League that season. Their unique style of having many players pushing forward in counterattacks earned them the nickname "Iron mace football".

In 2012, the club won the AFC Champions League, defeating Al-Ahli 3–0 in the final on 10 November. In the run up to the final, Ulsan went on an unbeaten run throughout the twelve games of the competition, winning nine consecutive games and scoring 27 goals in the process.

Players

Current squad

Out on loan

Managers

Kits

Kit suppliers
 1988–1993: Adidas
 1994–1996: Prospecs
 1997: Reebok
 1998: Adidas
 1999–2000: ASICS
 2001–2003: Hummel
 2004–2005: Kika
 2006–2009: Adidas
 2010–2011: Le Coq Sportif
 2012–2013: Diadora
 2014–2018: Adidas
 2018–2021: Hummel
 2022–present: Adidas

Honours

Domestic

League
 K League 1
Champions (3): 1996, 2005, 2022
Runners-up (10): 1986, 1991, 1998, 2002, 2003, 2011, 2013, 2019, 2020, 2021

Cups
 Korean FA Cup
Winners (1): 2017
Runners-up (3): 1998, 2018, 2020
 Korean League Cup
Winners (5): 1986, 1995, 1998, 2007, 2011
Runners-up (3): 1993, 2002, 2005
 Korean Super Cup
Winners (1): 2006
 National Football Championship
Runners-up (2): 1989, 1999
 Korean President's Cup
Runners-up (1): 1990

International

Asian
 AFC Champions League
Winners (2): 2012, 2020
 A3 Champions Cup
Winners (1): 2006

Season-by-season records

Key
Tms. = Number of teams
Pos. = Position in league

AFC Champions League record
All results list Ulsan Hyundai's goal tally first.

See also
 List of football clubs in South Korea
 Ulsan Hyundai Mipo Dolphin

References

External links

 Official website 

 
Association football clubs established in 1983
Sport in Ulsan
K League 1 clubs
Hyundai Heavy Industries Group
1983 establishments in South Korea
Works association football clubs in South Korea
AFC Champions League winning clubs